Hoovie's Garage is a YouTube channel featuring videos about cars and trucks. The videos are hosted by Tyler Hoover, who also presents "Car Issues" for Motor Trend on Demand.

Videos 
Hoover is known for purchasing cars he refers to as "hoopties", typically high-priced sports cars and vintage luxury vehicles in questionable operational condition, then repairing and demonstrating and eventually selling the vehicles.

References 

YouTube channels
2016 web series debuts
Living people
Year of birth missing (living people)